Anomoeotes elegans is a species of moth of the Anomoeotidae family. It is known from Kenya.

References

Endemic moths of Kenya
Anomoeotidae
Moths described in 1903
Moths of Africa